The , or   for short, is a Japanese railway line in Shizuoka Prefecture, paralleling the north coast of Lake Hamana between Kakegawa Station in Kakegawa and Shinjohara Station in Kosai.

History
The Japanese National Railways  was built as an alternative route for the Tokaido Main Line and in particular as a backup for the bridge over Lake Hamana, which was considered potentially vulnerable to weather disruption. The Japanese military also supported the project as the new line would be less vulnerable to coastal attack than the existing section of the Tokaido Main Line.

The line was used as a detour for the Tokaido Main Line following damage to it caused by the Tōnankai earthquake in December 1944 and military actions in July 1945.

Steam locomotives ceased service on the line in 1971, and all scheduled freight services were discontinued from 1984.

With the privatization of the Japan National Railways on March 15, 1987, the operations of the former Futamata line were taken over by the newly created third sector Tenryū Hamanako Railroad.

Thirty-six features of the line (including bridges and station buildings) are registered tangible cultural properties of Japan.

Former connecting lines
 Tenryu-Futamata station - Construction started on a 35 km line to Chubu-Tenryu on the Iida Line in 1967. Proposed to involve 20 bridges and 14 tunnels, about 13 km of roadbed, and about 50% of the overall work had been completed when construction was abandoned in 1980.
 Kanasashi station - The 26 km 762mm gauge line from Entetsu Hamamatsu station on the Enshu Railway Line to Okuyama opened between 1914 and 1923. The 8 km Entetsu Hamamatsu - Hikuma section was electrified at 600 VDC in 1950, the line closing in 1963/4

Description
Track: Single
Power: Internal Combustion (Diesel)
Railway signalling: Simplified automatic

Stations

See also
List of railway companies in Japan
List of railway lines in Japan

References

This article incorporates material from the corresponding article in the Japanese Wikipedia

External links 
 Tenryū Hamanako Railroad official website
 登録有形文化財紹介動画, 天竜浜名湖鉄道公式チャンネル

Railway lines in Japan
Rail transport in Shizuoka Prefecture
Railway lines opened in 1936
1067 mm gauge railways in Japan
Japanese third-sector railway lines